Mount Subasio is a mountain of the Apennine mountains, in the province of Perugia, Umbria, central Italy. On its slopes are located the ancient towns of Assisi and Spello.

The mountain stands about 1290 metres above sea level.

Its pink colored stones were used for many Franciscan buildings at the World Heritage site of Assisi. The area is included in the natural park Parco del Monte Subasio.

History
Castle Sasso Rosso ("Redrock") on the slope of Mount Subasio was the site of Saint Clare of Assisi and Saint Agnes of Assisi's childhood since according to tradition they were the daughters  of Favorino Scifi, Conte of Sasso-Rosso, the wealthy representative of an ancient Roman family, who owned a large palace in Assisi as well.

The Benedictine Abbot of St. Benedict of Monte Subasio gave the little church of Porziuncola around 1208 to St. Francis of Assisi, on condition of making it the mother house of his religious family.

Sources and references

External links
Park of Mount Subasio at Assisi Online
Parco del Monte Subasio (English) at parks.it
Thayer's Gazetteer of Umbria

Mountains of Umbria
Mountains of the Apennines